The 2011 Saskatchewan general election was held on November 7, 2011, to elect 58 members of the Legislative Assembly of Saskatchewan (MLAs). The election was called on October 10 by the Lieutenant Governor of Saskatchewan, on the advice of Premier Brad Wall. Wall's Saskatchewan Party government was re-elected with an increased majority of 49 seats, the third-largest majority government in the province's history.  The opposition New Democratic Party was cut down to only nine ridings, its worst showing in almost 30 years.

This was the first Saskatchewan provincial vote to use a fixed election date, set on the first Monday of November every four years.

Results

On election night, the incumbent Saskatchewan Party won 84% of the seats in the provincial legislature on the strength of 64% of the popular vote. In the process, they won the third-biggest majority government (in terms of percentage of seats won) in the province's history.  The only bigger majorities came in 1934, when the Liberals won 50 out of 55 seats, and 1982, when the Tories won 55 out of 64.  The NDP recorded its lowest share of the popular vote since 1938, when it was known as the Saskatchewan Co-operative Commonwealth Federation.  The NDP was reduced to its smallest presence in the legislature since 1982, when the party won the same number of seats in what was then a larger assembly.  Opposition leader Dwain Lingenfelter was unseated.

The Saskatchewan Party maintained their dominance of rural regions, and also broke the NDP's longstanding grip on the province's two largest cities, Regina and Saskatoon.  The Green Party failed to win any seats – though they ran a full slate of 58 candidates and took third place in the overall popular vote, ahead of the Liberal Party. The Liberals put most of their resources into getting party leader Ryan Bater elected in the Battlefords, but he finished a distant third. The Progressive Conservatives made a small gain in popular vote for the second straight election.

|- style="background:#ccc;"
! rowspan="2" colspan="2" style="text-align:left;"|Party
! rowspan="2" style="text-align:left;"|Party leader
!rowspan="2"|Candidates
! colspan="4" style="text-align:center;"|Seats
! colspan="3" style="text-align:center;"|Popular vote
|- style="background:#ccc;"
| style="text-align:center;"|2007
| style="text-align:center;"|Dissol.
| style="text-align:center;"|2011
| style="text-align:center;"|Change
| style="text-align:center;"|#
| style="text-align:center;"|%
| style="text-align:center;"|Change

|align=left|Brad Wall
|align="right"|58
|align="right"|38
|align="right"|38
|align="right"|49
|align="right"|+11
|align="right"|258,598
|align="right"|64.25
|align="right"|+13.33

|align=left|New Democratic
|align=left|Dwain Lingenfelter
|align="right"|58
|align="right"|20
|align="right"|20
|align="right"|9
|align="right"|-11
|align="right"|128,673
|align="right"|31.97
|align="right"|-5.27

|align=left|Victor Lau
|align="right"|58
|align="right"|0
|align="right"|0
|align="right"|0
|align="right"|–
|align="right"|11,561
|align="right"|2.87
|align="right"|+0.86

|align=left|Liberal
|align=left|Ryan Bater
|align="right"|9
|align="right"|0
|align="right"|0
|align="right"|0
|align="right"|–
|align="right"|2,237
|align="right"|0.56
|align="right"|-8.84

|align=left|Progressive Conservative
|align=left|Rick Swenson
|align="right"|5
|align="right"|0
|align="right"|0
|align="right"|0
|align="right"|–
|align="right"|1,315
|align="right"|0.33
|align="right"|+0.15

|align=left|Dana Arnason
|align="right"|2
|align="right"|0
|align="right"|0
|align="right"|0
|align="right"|–
|align="right"|58
|align="right"|0.01
|align="right"|-0.12

| colspan="2" style="text-align:left;"|Independent
|align="right"|1
|align="right"|0
|align="right"|0
|align="right"|0
|align="right"|–
|align="right"|44
|align="right"|0.01
|align="right"|
|-
| style="text-align:left;" colspan="3"|Total
| style="text-align:right;"|191
| style="text-align:right;"|58
| style="text-align:right;"|58
| style="text-align:right;"|58
| style="text-align:right;"|
| style="text-align:right;"|402,486
| style="text-align:right;"|100.00
| style="text-align:right;"| 
|}

Percentages

Ranking

Results by region

The Saskatchewan Party maintained their sweep of the southern and central rural ridings.  The Saskatchewan Party succeeded in unseating New Democrats in all of the smaller cities – including Moose Jaw, The Battlefords, and Prince Albert.  The Saskatchewan Party also won eight of the 12 ridings in Saskatoon, marking the first time since the 1982 PC landslide that a centre-right party had won the most seats in that city.  This didn't come as a surprise, since Saskatoon has traditionally been friendly to centre-right parties and candidates.  However – and perhaps most surprisingly – the Saskatchewan Party also took eight out of 11 ridings in Regina, in part due to picking up local support from the largely absent Liberal Party.  As was the case in Saskatoon, this was the first time a centre-right party had won the most seats there since 1982.

The New Democratic Party maintained their hold on the two northernmost ridings in Saskatchewan, in addition to three seats in the provincial capital and four constituencies in Saskatoon.  The NDP recorded the lowest share of the popular vote since 1938 (when it was known as the CCF).  However, compared to its result in 1982, NDP support in 2011 was more concentrated in the North and the inner cities of Regina and Saskatoon, a factor which allowed the party to equal its 1982-seat tally (and indeed exceed it in terms of proportion of seats).  Also, for the first time in history, a Saskatchewan NDP leader lost his own seat, with Dwain Lingenfelter losing by a shocking 10-percentage-point margin in Regina Douglas Park to a Saskatchewan Party challenger.

Timeline

2007
November 21, 2007 – Premier Brad Wall & Cabinet Ministers are sworn in.

2008
January 3, 2008 – NDP MLA Joan Beatty announces she will resign her seat in Cumberland to enter federal politics.
June 25, 2008 – Doyle Vermette holds the seat of Cumberland for the New Democrats.
October 16, 2008 – NDP Leader Lorne Calvert announces he will retire from politics as soon as his successor is chosen.

2009
May 29, 2009 – Premier Brad Wall shuffles his Cabinet.
June 6, 2009 – Dwain Lingenfelter is elected Leader of the Saskatchewan NDP over Ryan Meili on the second ballot.
June 30, 2009 – NDP MLA Harry Van Mulligen resigns his seat in Regina Douglas Park, officially retiring from politics. Lorne Calvert resigns his seat in Saskatoon Riversdale the same day.
September 21, 2009 – Dwain Lingenfelter & Danielle Chartier hold the constituencies of Regina Douglas Park & Saskatoon Riversdale, respectively, for the NDP.
October 21, 2009 – Dwain Lingenfelter is sworn in as Leader of the Official Opposition.

2010
January 29, 2010 – NDP MLA Kim Trew announces that he will not be running in the next election.
April 16, 2010 – Saskatchewan Party MLA Serge LeClerc resigns from the caucus to sit as an Independent MLA. On April 20, he announces that he will not be running in the next election.
May 13, 2010 – NDP MLA Ron Harper announces that he will retire at the end of his term.
June 2, 2010 – Saskatchewan Party MLA Joceline Schriemer announces that she will not run for re-election.
June 23, 2010 – Finance Minister Rod Gantefoer announces that he will retire at the next election.
June 29, 2010 – Premier Brad Wall shuffles his Cabinet.
August 31, 2010 – Independent MLA Serge LeClerc resigns his seat in the Legislature, leaving politics.
October 18, 2010 – Gordon Wyant of the Saskatchewan Party wins the seat of Saskatoon Northwest in a byelection.

2011
January 11, 2011 – NDP MLA Pat Atkinson announces that she will retire at the next provincial election.
March 5, 2011 – Saskatchewan Party MLA Denis Allchurch loses his party's nomination for Rosthern-Shellbrook to Scott Moe.
September 6, 2011 – Larissa Shasko abruptly resigns from the leadership of the Green Party of Saskatchewan; Shasko also gives up her candidacy for the Greens in Moose Jaw North. Federal Green Party of Canada leader Elizabeth May announces (via Twitter) that veteran provincial party activist Victor Lau will temporarily lead the Saskatchewan Greens.
September 25, 2011 – Lau elected leader of the Green Party at an extraordinary convention in Regina.
October 10, 2011 – Premier Brad Wall asks Lieutenant Governor Gordon Barnhart to dissolve the Legislative Assembly and issue writs of election.
October 22, 2011 – Nominations close with 191 candidates running in 58 electoral districts.

Incumbents not contesting their seats

Retiring incumbents

Opinion polls

Riding-by-riding results
People in bold represent cabinet ministers and the speaker. Party leaders are italicized. The symbols ** indicates MLAs who did not run again.

All results are preliminary until approved by Elections Saskatchewan.

Northwest Saskatchewan

Northeast Saskatchewan

West Central Saskatchewan

Southwest Saskatchewan

Southeast Saskatchewan

Saskatoon

Regina

Marginal seats
The following is a list of ridings which had narrowly been lost by the indicated party in the 2007 election. The symbol " * " indicates the incumbent MLA is not running again.

Political parties
Saskatchewan Party
Saskatchewan NDP
Green Party of Saskatchewan
Saskatchewan Liberal Party
Progressive Conservative Party of Saskatchewan
Western Independence Party of Saskatchewan

External links
Election Almanac - Saskatchewan Provincial Election 2011
Elections Saskatchewan - Nominated Candidates for the November 7, 2011 General Election
Saskatchewan Party Candidate list
Elections Saskatchewan - Official Results of the 2011 Provincial Election

References

2011 elections in Canada
2011
2011 in Saskatchewan
November 2011 events in Canada